Sydney South West Area Health Service, abbreviated SSWAHS and known by the corporate name Sydney South West Health, was an area health service charged with the provision of public health services in central and south-western Sydney. It was formed in January 2005 from the amalgamation of the former Central Sydney Area Health Service and the South Western Sydney Area Health Service. It was a statutory body of the New South Wales Government,  operating under the NSW Department of Health.  The head office of SSWAHS was located in Liverpool. It was disbanded on 1 January 2011 as part of the National Health Reform and creation of Local Hospital Networks, and replaced by the Sydney Local Health District and South Western Sydney Local Health District.

Major facilities

Eastern Zone
The Eastern Zone of SSWAHS comprised the facilities of the former Central Sydney Area Health Service. Major facilities in the Eastern Zone were:
Canterbury Hospital, Canterbury
Concord Repatriation General Hospital, Concord
Royal Prince Alfred Hospital, Camperdown
Concord Centre for Mental Health, Concord (Sydney South West Area Mental Health Service)
Sydney Dental Hospital, Surry Hills
Balmain Hospital, Balmain

Western Zone
The Western Zone of SSWAHS comprised the facilities of the former South Western Sydney Area Health Service. Major facilities in the Western Zone were:
Bankstown Lidcombe Hospital, Bankstown
Camden Hospital, Camden
Campbelltown Hospital, Campbelltown
Fairfield Hospital, Fairfield
Liverpool Hospital, Liverpool
Bowral Hospital, Bowral

See also
List of hospitals in Australia

References

External links
Sydney South West Area Health Service website
Sydney Local Health District website
South Western Sydney Local Health District website

Government agencies of New South Wales
Healthcare in Sydney